James Crichton, Viscount Frendraught (died c. 1664/65) was a Scottish peer.

Life
He was the eldest son of James Crichton of Frendraught, by Elizabeth, eldest daughter of John Gordon, 13th earl of Sutherland. 
He was descended from William Crichton, 1st Lord Crichton. His father was of very turbulent disposition, and in October 1630 several friends whom he had urged to stay in the tower at Frendraught Castle to protect him from the threatened assault of his enemies were burnt to death there under circumstances that threw suspicion on himself. His chief enemies were the Gordons of Rothiemay, who repeatedly plundered Frendraught.

The son James Crichton was created baron of Frendraught in 1641 and Viscount Frendraught in 1642. He took part in Montrose's last expedition, and was present at the Battle of Carbisdale (1650). In the rout Montrose's horse was disabled, and Frendraught gave him his own, which enabled him to make good his escape for a time.

Frendraught died some time between 14 July 1664 and 17 August 1665 by his own hand on the field of battle, and was succeeded by his son by his second marriage, also named James. James, 2nd Viscount Frendraught, was a Jacobite who, during the first Jacobite rising of 1689–91, signed a Band of Association at Tomintoul on 15 January 1690, organised by John Grant of Ballindalloch, supporting James VII and II. The 2nd Viscount died before 1 August 1699.

References

Attribution

1660s deaths
Year of birth unknown
Viscounts in the Peerage of Scotland
Peers of Scotland created by Charles I